The 2001–02 Coppa Italia was the 55th edition of the tournament, which began on August 12, 2001 and ended on May 10, 2002.  After losing in the finals the previous year, Parma won the 2001–02 Coppa Italia tournament for the 3rd time in club history.  Parma defeated Juventus in the finals, winning on the away goals rule with an aggregate score of 2-2.

Group stage

Group 1

Group 2

Group 3

Group 4

Group 5

Group 6

Group 7

Group 8

Knockout stage

Final

First leg

Second leg

Parma won on away goals rule.

Top goalscorers

References
Rsssf.com
Footballdatabase.eu

Coppa Italia seasons
Italy
Coppa Italia